PetroVietnam Insurance  Joint-Stock Company (PVI ) is a Vietnamese insurance company. The state-owned PetroVietnam holds a controlling stake in PVI.

It had a share of around 20% in the insurance market (excluding life insurance) in 2011, making it the second largest insurer just after Bao Viet Insurance and before Bao Minh and PJICO. It has been the only one of the four big insurers that were able to significantly increase their market share from just over 10% in 2005, while market leader Bao Viet and Bao Minh have continuously lost market shares.

PVI has a strategic partnership with Talanx AG, a German insurer. Talanx has been holding 25% of PVI's shares since August 2011 and decided to acquire another 6% in May 2012.

References

Insurance companies of Vietnam
Financial services companies established in 1996
Government-owned insurance companies